This is a list of women artists who were born in Chile or whose artworks are closely associated with that country.

A
Graciela Aranis (1908–1996), painter
Claudia Aravena (born 1968), artist, curator, filmmaker, and professor
Ximena Armas (born 1946), painter
Herminia Arrate (1895–1941), painter, First Lady

B
Catalina Bauer (born 1976), visual artist
Roser Bru (1923–2021), painter and engraver

C
Gloria Camiruaga (1941–2006), video artist
Celia Castro (1880–1930), Chile's first professional female artist
Marta Colvin (1907–1995), sculptor
Ana Cortés (1895–1998), painter

D
Emma Formas de Dávila (1883–1959), painter
Marcela Donoso (born 1961), painter

E
Virginia Errázuriz (born 1941), painter

G
Lily Garafulic (1914–2012), sculptor
Teresa Gazitúa (born 1941), painter, writer, educator

H
Laila Havilio (born 1960), sculptor

M
Rebeca Matte Bello (1875–1929), sculptor
Aurora Mira (1863–1939), painter
Magdalena Mira (1859–1930), painter and sculptor
Elmina Moisan (1897–1938), Chilean painter 
Ximena Morla Lynch (1891–1987), painter

P
Catalina Parra (born 1940), photomontage artist
Matilde Pérez (1916–2014), painter, sculptor, kinetic artist
Henriette Petit (1894–1983), painter
Christiane Pooley (born 1983), visual artist
Dora Puelma (1898-1972), painter, sculptor

R
Laura Rodig (1901–1972), painter, sculptor, illustrator, educator
Lotty Rosenfeld (1943–2020), interdisciplinary artist
Alejandra Ruddoff (born 1960), sculptor

S
Soledad Salamé (born 1954), printmaker, multimedia installations, sculptor; founder of Sol Print Studio.

Francisca Sutil (born 1952), painter and printmaker

T
Janet Toro (born 1963), performance artist, activist

V
Eugenia Vargas (born 1949), contemporary artist 
Cecilia Vicuña (born 1948), poet, artist, filmmaker, activist

Z
Ximena Zomosa (born 1966), contemporary artist

-
Chilean women artists, List of
Artists
Artists